(born October 13, 1964) is a former Japanese professional baseball player.  He played for the Yakult Swallows in the Japan Central League. He later played for the Kintetsu Buffaloes of the Japan Pacific League.  He ended his career playing with the Yokohama BayStars of the Japan Central League.

References

1964 births
Living people
Baseball people from Yokohama
Nippon Professional Baseball outfielders
Nippon Professional Baseball Rookie of the Year Award winners
Yakult Swallows players
Kintetsu Buffaloes players
Yokohama BayStars players
Japanese baseball coaches
Nippon Professional Baseball coaches
Baseball players at the 1984 Summer Olympics
Olympic baseball players of Japan
Olympic gold medalists for Japan
Medalists at the 1984 Summer Olympics